The 2019–20 UC Riverside Highlanders men's basketball team represented the University of California, Riverside in the 2019–20 NCAA Division I men's basketball season. The Highlanders, led by second-year head coach David Patrick, played their home games at SRC Arena in Riverside, California as members of the Big West Conference. They finished the season 17–15, 7–9 in Big West play to finish in sixth place. They were set to be the No. 6 seed in the Big West tournament. However, the Big West tournament was canceled amid the COVID-19 pandemic.

Previous season
The Highlanders finished the 2018–19 season 10–23 overall, 4–12 in Big West play, finishing in 8th place. In the Big West tournament, they were defeated by UC Irvine in the quarterfinals.

Roster

Schedule and results

|-
!colspan=12 style=| Exhibition

|-
!colspan=12 style=| Non-conference regular season

|-
!colspan=9 style=| Big West regular season

|-
!colspan=12 style=| Big West tournament
|-

|-

Sources:

References

UC Riverside Highlanders men's basketball seasons
UC Riverside Highlanders
UC Riverside Highlanders men's basketball
UC Riverside Highlanders men's basketball